Evander Holyfield vs. Henry Tillman, billed as "The St. Valentine's Day Massacre", was a professional boxing match contested between reigning WBA cruiserweight champion, Evander Holyfield, and the WBA's number one ranked contender, Henry Tillman, with Holyfield's WBA title on the line. The bout took place on February 14, 1987, at Bally's Reno in Reno, Nevada.

Background
Evander Holyfield had defeated Dwight Muhammad Qawi via split decision in July 1986 to capture the WBA cruiserweight title, the first world title of his career. The first defense of Holyfield's title was announced to be against his 1984 Olympic teammate and gold medalist Henry Tillman, who like Holyfield, had turned pro in late 1984 and become a top prospect in the cruiserweight division, having already won NABF cruiserweight title and sporting a 14–1 record with the only blemish on his professional record being a close decision loss to Bert Cooper. Before facing Tillman, Holyfield first took a non-title tuneup fight in December 1986 against Mike Brothers (after his previously announced opponent Marcos Geraldo withdrew), easily defeating him by third-round knockout.

The fight
The fight would prove to be a mismatch as Holyfield would have little trouble beating Tillman, knocking him down four times during the course of the bout. After a relatively close first round (which one judge had winning, which would prove to be the only round Tillman would win on any of the three scorecards), Holyfield dropped Tillman early in the second with a left hook. After Tillman arose and took the mandatory standing eight count, he charged at Holyfield, attempting to trade punches with him though Holyfield continued to pepper Tillman with powerful body shots throughout the round, though Tillman survived the round. Holyfield would continue to dominate Tillman and in round 7, Holyfield would land an uppercut followed by a left–right uppercut that dropped Tillman to the canvas. Tillman would again arise and continued though Holyfield continued his attack and soon sent Tillman down again with another left–right combination, though Tillman would answer the 10-count at nine. Holyfield quickly attacked Tillman with two left hooks that dropped Tillman for the third time in the round, with the three-knockdown rule in effect, the fight was immediately stopped and Holyfield was named the winner by technical knockout at 1:43 of round 7.

Fight card

References

1987 in boxing
Boxing in Nevada
Tillman
February 1987 sports events in the United States